Taforalt or Grotte des Pigeons is a cave in the province of Berkane, Aït Iznasen region, Morocco, possibly the oldest cemetery in North Africa (Humphrey et al. 2012). It contained at least 34 Iberomaurusian adolescent and adult human skeletons, as well as younger ones, from the Upper Palaeolithic between 15,100 and 14,000 calendar years ago. There is archaeological evidence for Iberomaurusian occupation at the site between 23,200 and 12,600 calendar years ago, as well as evidence for Aterian occupation as old as 85,000 years.

Site description
La Grotte des Pigeons is a cave in eastern Morocco near the village of Taforalt. These occupation layers include pre-Mousterian, Aterian, and Iberomaurusian lithic industries, plus an unusual non-Levallois industry between the Aterian and the Iberomaurusian dating to c. 24,500 cal BP. These industries date from the Middle Stone Age and the Later Stone Age. Excavations of the Iberomaurusian layers dating from 15,100 to 14,000 years ago have recovered dozens of burials with some showing evidence of postmortem processing. Some show potential rituals with burials containing animal remains including horns, mandibles, a hoof, and a tooth. The deep and highly stratified cave floor has yielded hearths, lithics, and shell beads, among a variety of artefacts of varying ages. The dryness of the cave has contributed to the notable level of preservation found among the remains and artefacts.

Geography

The site is located around steep hills, rocky mountains, and the natural vegetation of the thermo-Mediterranean biozone including Tetraclinis articulate and Pinus halenpensis. The area itself is located in the Eastern part of Morocco near the community of Taforalt (Tafoughalt) at (34°48′38″ N, 2°24′30″ W). The large mouth of the cave opens to the northeast and has an area > .

Culture 
The earliest layers of human habitation in the cave, dating from 85,000-82,000 years ago, contain evidence of a pre-Mousterian industry where no evidence of the Levallois lithic technology is apparent. The following (newer) layers contain side scrapers, small radial Levallois cores, and thin, bifacially worked foliate points typical of the Aterian technological industries. These Aterian layers were dated to come from approximately 32,000 to >40,000 years ago, though other research has found a non-Levallois industry continuing at the site until 25,000 years ago. By about 21,000 years ago, the Iberomaurusian industry marked by microlithic backed bladelets became the dominant archaeological material, which has been found at the site. These Iberomaurusian layers contain microlithics, ostrich egg shells, potentially ritualized primary and secondary burials, and a notable increase in land snail remains indicating a shift in dietary practices.

Excavation history
The cave was discovered in 1908 and was excavated in 1944–1947, 1950–1955, 1969-1977, and 2003-2018. Much of the field records from the early excavations have been lost. In 1951, Roche's team discovered human remains associated with the Iberomaurusian. The Roche excavation encountered 10 metres of archaeological deposits with the Iberomaurusian occupying the top . This same stratification has been encountered in the subsequent excavations in other parts of the cave. Because of the dozens of skeletons located by Roche in the 1950s and the burials located during the Bouzouggar, Barton, and Humphrey excavations taking place since 2003, Grotte des Pigeons represents what is likely the earliest and most extensively used known prehistoric cemetery in North Africa.

Stratigraphy 

The Yellow series goes from the beginning of the occupation of the cave about 85,000 years ago to c. 15,000 cal BP. The overlying Grey Series dates from c. 15,000 to 12,500 cal BP ago, and hence accumulated rapidly in some 2500 years. The Grey Series, associated with the later Iberomaurusian, is characterized by extensive hearths and charcoal deposits (hence its colour), along with all of the site's burials. The Yellow Series is associated with the earlier Iberomaurusian, as well as with Levallois artefacts of the Aterian industry. The increased density of artefacts and evidence of food production in the Grey Series is seen as a sign of year-round occupation at the site whereas the Yellow Series is seen as evidence of seasonal habitation with occasional periods without humans. There is a theorized 2,000 year gap of habitation between 18,000 and 20,000 uncal BP with this sterile layer being noted in Sector 8 of Barton’s excavations, though other excavations near the mouth of the cave challenge this finding.

Dating
With 67 radiocarbon dates, Taforalt is the most extensively dated site of the North African Later Stone Age. Starting in the 1960s, it has been dated with both conventional and AMS radiocarbon dating, OSL, TL, and U-series. Looking at all dates recovered from excavations, the habitation dates in this cave stretch from 12,500 cal BP ago to 85,000 years ago with a shift to sedentary habitation about 15,000 cal BP. The local environmental data helps establish the seasonality of the site as much of the modern vegetation was utilized by the prehistoric population and follows a set seasonal process of food production. The presence of plant remains that would have been harvested in spring indicate that the cave or nearby environs were inhabited during that season. Proxies for environmental conditions during the phases of cave occupation are available from both wood charcoal and small mammal evidence. A feature of considerable interest in the charcoal record concerns the fluctuating presence of cedar in the C–F sequence. Cedrus currently grows in Morocco only from ≈1,300–2,600 m in the Rif, the Middle Atlas, and Eastern High Atlas, and its presence throughout the Taforalt record highlights a significant vegetation shift since the Holocene. In particular, the vegetation excavated by Barton in Group E is dominated by the presence of Cedrus atlantica and deciduous Quercus, with the latter declining at the expense of Cedrus. This is consistent with environmental cooling and drying that comes with a change to a montane climate. This climatic shift coincides with the dates recovered from Group E and validates the dates recovered there.

Archaeological finds

Artefacts 
The lithic collections recovered from the excavations at Grotte des Pigeons reflect a wide range of technologies and include unretouched and retouched flakes and bladelets, single and opposed platform bladelet cores, river cobbles, microburins, La Mouillah points, backed bladelets, Ouchtata bladelets, obtuse-ended backed bladelets, side scrapers, large bifacial tools, shell beads associated with bifacial foliates and tanged tools associated with the Aterian culture, and potential rock palettes.

Faunal remains 
Animal remains found at the site largely appear to be food waste though excavations in the 1950s and 2000s, 2010s have revealed burials associated with antelope horns, bovine horns, and at least one horse tooth. The more sedentary Grey Series phase includes a substantial amount of land Mollusca remains in conjunction with hearths indicating extensive land snail collection and cooking. The earliest layers from approximately 80,000 years ago contain shell beads of the N. gibbosulus however analysis of these shells indicate that they were collected along the Mediterranean shore after they had been dead. Ash lenses from the Aterian levels around 80,000 BP contain large Otala punctate indicating small scale exploitation of land snails prior to the Grey Series.

Floral remains 
The vegetation species found inside the cave provide an idea what the environment was like during periods of human habitation with the charred remains of Holm oak (Quercus ilex L.) acorns, Maritime pine (Pinus pinaster Aiton) pine nuts, Juniper (Juniperus phoenicea L.), Terebinth pistachio (Pistacia terebinthus L.), and wild oat (Avena sp.) being recovered after likely being collected and processed by the previous inhabitants.

Human remains 
Sector 10, excavated by Humphrey, and the burial deposits excavated by Roche in the 1950s, form a contiguous and spatially demarcated collective burial area with dozens of closely spaced burials. The presence of both articulated and disarticulated bones indicates extensive use and reuse of the burial area with evidence of secondary burial and selective bone removal being practiced, often disturbing or truncating earlier burials. Some burials were covered by large stones preventing future disturbances by burials. The Roche excavations originally estimated that they had recovered the remains of approximately 180 individuals, but subsequent research adjusted this estimate to between 35 and 40 individuals. These remains were not directly dated by Roche but based on the stratigraphy they were from a greater depth, and therefore greater age, than those in Sector 10. The recent excavations taking place in Sector 10 have recovered thirteen partially articulated skeletons along with a sample of disarticulated bones. Seven bone samples from Sector 10 yielded age estimates between approximately 15,077 and 13,892 years ago, corresponding to the base of the Grey Series deposits seen in Sector 8 excavations. Burials situated toward the front of the cave and those higher within the deposits are likely to be progressively younger, and hence contemporary with higher levels in the Grey Series deposits recorded in Sector 8. A range of funerary practices is apparent based on the grave excavations that have taken place. Some remains appear to have been primary inhumations while others appear to have sustained secondary inhumation after removal for potentially ritual practices. Evidence of deliberate post-mortem modification include cut marks that are not indicative of cannibalism and extensive ochre colouring with one grave, Grave XII, containing Individual 1 with both cut marks and ochre colouring present on the majority of the nearly intact skeleton. Roche’s excavations in the 1950s yielded a single mandible from the Aterian levels.

A 2003 analysis of masticatory and non-masticatory dental modifications among the remains recovered in the 1950s reflected a very high rate (90%) of avulsion of the upper central incisors which subsequently led to increased usage of the proximal teeth. Ritual tooth removal is known elsewhere in this region at other points in prehistory and history and likely took place during the entrance to adulthood. The food processing tasks of the teeth are reflected in the heavy chipping, perhaps indicative of a gritty diet involving bone and shell. Half of the surviving teeth (51.2%) exhibited carious lesions while archaeological hunter-gatherers are expected to range between 0% – 14.3% and agriculturalists range between 2.2% - 48.1%. These numbers are likely a result of the acorns and pine nuts which would have been collected and processed, resulting in fermentable carbohydrates. The women in the population do not reflect the same proximal tooth wear as their upper central incisors were typically not removed.

A 2000 analysis of non-metric dental traits indicated genetic continuity from the terminal Pleistocene onward in the Iberomaurusian and Capsian areas.

Occupation site utility
The inhabitants of Grotte des Pigeons were hunter-gathers equipped with the knowledge of harvesting plants and animals as the archaeological context suggests some of the burials contained evidence of baskets and grind stones which were used for food preparation. Some of the foods harvested from their local environment included acorns, pine nuts, and land molluscs. The site exhibits evidence that the people that lived in this area used the cave year round by the Grey Series while staying there seasonally during the Yellow Series. The perforated marine shells present from the 85,000 – 82,000 year old level at Grotte des Pigeons and other sites in the nearby Maghreb dated from that period reflect an exchange network that likely existed in order to provide shells to communities 40 km from the coast (Taforalt) and further. While the meaning behind the beads cannot be discerned, the presence of an apparently widespread exchange network to facilitate their transport as well as their being worked for apparent ornamentation indicate some significance behind them.

World Heritage status
This site was added to the UNESCO World Heritage Tentative List on July 1, 1995 in the Cultural category under the name "Grotte de Taforalt".

Ancient DNA

In 2018, van de Loosdrecht et al. performed the first aDNA tests on the ancient Taforalt individuals, directly dated to between 15,100 and 13,900 cal BP. The Taforalt samples are the oldest human DNA samples from Africa yet recovered. DNA analysis was performed on seven individuals: six males and one female. Only five of individuals, including four of the males, with higher coverage genomes were used in the nuclear DNA analysis. Nuclear DNA analysis reveals that the Taforalt individuals were all closely related to each other, showing evidence of a population bottleneck event in their past."

The Taforalt genomes were found to be composed of three major components: a Holocene West-Eurasian/Levantine component, a Hadza hunter-gatherer component from Tanzania, and a West African component. The Taforalt individuals shows the relative closest genetic affinity for ancient Epipaleolithic Natufian individuals, with slightly greater affinity for the Natufians than later Neolithic Levantines. A two-way admixture scenario using Holocene Levantines and modern West African samples as reference populations inferred that the Taforalt individuals bore 63.5% Levantine-related and 36.5% Sub-Saharan African-related ancestries, with no evidence for additional gene flow from the Epigravettian culture of Upper Paleolithic Europe. The Taforalt individuals also show evidence of limited Neanderthal ancestry.

When compared against modern populations, the Taforalt individuals form a distinct cluster and do not cluster genetically with any modern population; however, they were found to cluster between Middle Easterners or modern North Africans and West/East Africans. The Taforalt individuals also exhibit higher levels of indigenous African ("Sub-Saharan African") ancestry than do modern North Africans. The Sub-Saharan African DNA in Taforalt individuals is best samplified, most of all, by modern West Africans (e.g., Yoruba, or Mende). Additionally, the Taforalt samples of the Iberomaurusian culture also shares partial similarities with the remnants of a more basal Sub-Saharan African lineage (e.g., basal to modern West and East African lineages), suggesting the African component derives from a population prior or close to the split between West and Eastern indigenous Africans.

A 2018 DNA analysis shows that the Taforalt individuals belonged to the mtDNA haplogroups U6a and M1b, as well as to the Y-DNA haplogroup E1b1b1a1 (M78), which is closely related to the E1b1b1b (M123) sublineage that has been observed in skeletal remains belonging to the Epipaleolithic Natufian and Pre-Pottery Neolithic cultures of the Levant, possibly suggesting geneflow.

Since the Natufian samples, which are chronologically younger than the Taforalt samples by several thousands of years, were inferred to lack substantial African ancestry, the researchers also hypothesized that a Maghreb center of evolution for the Natufian-related ancestry could only be plausible if the admixture that was inferred for the Taforalt individuals either occurred after the population ancestral to the Natufians had moved into the Levant or if that admixture event was a locally-confined phenomenon at Taforalt.

Phenotypic analysis was performed on four of the Taforalt individuals with higher genomic coverage. The Taforalt individuals tested did not carry either of the derived SLC24A5 alleles associated with lighter skin color, the derived OCA2 allele associated with blue eye color, or the derived MCM6 allele associated with lactase persistence. However, they were found to carry the ancestral SLC24A4 allele associated with dark eye color, suggesting that the West-Eurasian migrant group may not have evolved light skin yet.

See also
Ifri n'Ammar
Kelif el Boroud
Mechta-Afalou

References

External links
 Grotte des Pigeons
 Grotte de Taforalt - UNESCO World Heritage Centre

Archaeological sites in Morocco
Caves of Morocco